Panče Ristevski (born 30 September 1974) is a retired Macedonian football midfielder.

References

1974 births
Living people
Macedonian footballers
FK Pobeda players
FK Rabotnički players
FK Belasica players
KF Apolonia Fier players
North Macedonia international footballers
Association football midfielders
Macedonian expatriate footballers
Expatriate footballers in Albania
Macedonian expatriate sportspeople in Albania